Simon VI may refer to:

 Simon de Montfort, 6th Earl of Leicester  ( – 1265)
 Simon de Montfort the Younger (1240–1271)
 Simon VI, Count of Lippe (1544–1613)